The McLaren MP4/9 was a Formula One car designed by Neil Oatley and used by the McLaren team in the 1994 Formula One World Championship. The number 7 car was driven by Finn Mika Häkkinen, in his first full season with the team, while the number 8 car was driven by Briton Martin Brundle, who had signed from Ligier. Frenchman Philippe Alliot deputised in the number 7 car at the Hungarian Grand Prix when Häkkinen was banned from driving in this race. For the 21st consecutive year, Marlboro was the team's title sponsor, with additional sponsorship from Hugo Boss, Shell and Goodyear. The MP4/9 was the first and only McLaren F1 car to utilise Peugeot engines.

Background and design 
Due to changes in Formula One regulations intended to return emphasis on driver skills, many technologies designed to aid the driver, such as active suspension, power-assisted brakes, ABS and traction control, which had featured on the previous season's car, were no longer permitted. Visually the car was otherwise very similar to the preceding MP4/8.

The engine proved unreliable and both Häkkinen and Brundle retired from the first two races with each suffering one engine failure. The  A6 V10 was then introduced, and while it gave Häkkinen third place at San Marino and Brundle second at Monaco, the engine was generally regarded as a "hand grenade" due to frequent failures in testing, qualifying and races. It was not until Italy that Peugeot started to get reliability from the engine.

Second driver disputes 
At the behest of Peugeot, the team's test driver was Frenchman Philippe Alliot. The French company preferred Alliot, who had been a lead driver with their World Sportscar team, over Brundle for the role of the second driver—something which infuriated McLaren team boss Ron Dennis, as he did not think much of Alliot's driving and clearly preferred Brundle; Alliot had been in F1 since  and had a reputation for being fast but accident-prone. Brundle had also been racing Grands Prix since 1984 and, while fast, was also a much more steady driver. Alliot, whose only role in the team was as a test and reserve driver, only raced for the team as a one-off replacement for Häkkinen in Hungary, as the Finn was serving a one-race ban after being held responsible for a large accident on the first lap at the preceding German Grand Prix.

1994 season summary 
By the standards of McLaren's recent cars the MP4/9 was a disappointment, failing to win any races (the first time McLaren had failed to win a race since ) and hampered by poor reliability and performance from its Peugeot engine (taken from the Peugeot 905 sports car that won Le Mans twice). Early in the season, Ron Dennis had believed rivalry between the French manufacturer and compatriots Renault would lead to rapid development and performance. As the season progressed the engines suffered regular and frequently spectacular failures (including at the British Grand Prix where Brundle's engine erupted into flames within a second of the green flag), and causing the team to doubt Peugeot's commitment to the project. By late 1994 the team announced it had parted company with the engine supplier in favour of a long-term deal with Mercedes.

Complete Formula One results
(key)

References

External links

1994 Formula One season cars
McLaren MP4 09